Guthega Dam is concrete gravity dam with an uncontrolled spillway across the Snowy River in the Snowy Mountains of New South Wales, Australia. The dam's main purpose is for the storage of water used in the generation of hydro-power . It is the first to be completed of the sixteen major dams of the Snowy Mountains Scheme, a vast hydroelectricity and irrigation complex constructed in south-east Australia between 1949 and 1974 and now run by Snowy Hydro.

The impounded reservoir is called Guthega Pondage.

Location and features
Guthega dam is one of the sixteen major dams of the Snowy Mountains Scheme. The dam was constructed by Semler Engineering based on engineering plans developed under contract by the Snowy Mountains Hydroelectric Authority, with Albert Francis Ronalds as Chief Civil Designing Engineer.

Power generation

See also

 Kosciuszko National Park
 List of dams and reservoirs in New South Wales
 Snowy Hydro Limited
 Snowy Mountains Scheme
 Snowy Scheme Museum

References

External links
 

Snowy Mountains Scheme
Gravity dams
Dams in New South Wales
Dams completed in 1955
Kosciuszko National Park
Murray-Darling basin
1955 establishments in Australia